Deans may refer to:

People
 Austen Deans (1915–2011), New Zealand painter and war artist
 Colin Deans (born 1955), Scottish rugby union player
 Craig Deans (born 1974), Australian football (soccer) player
 Diane Deans (born 1958), Canadian politician
 Dixie Deans (born 1946), Scottish football player (Celtic)
 Ian Deans (1937–2016), Canadian politician
 Kathryn Deans, Australian author
 Mickey Deans (1934–2003), fifth and last husband of Judy Garland
 Ray Deans (born 1966), Scottish football player
 Robbie Deans (born 1959), New Zealand rugby coach and former player
 Steven Deans (born 1982), ice hockey player
 Tommy Deans (1922–2000), Scottish football (soccer) player
 More than one Dean

Places
 Deans, New Jersey
 Deans, West Lothian